Sehra is a female given name, roughly equivalent to Sarah, Sara, Serass.

Sehra may refer to:

 Sehra (poetry), a poem or prothalamion sung at a nikah (Muslim wedding) in praise of the groom, praying to God for his future wedded life
 Sehra (headdress), a headdress worn by the groom during Pakistani, Indian and Bangladeshi weddings
 Sehra (film), a 1963 Hindi romantic family drama film
 Gupz Sehra (born 1988), Punjabi music director